"Making Memories of Us" is a song written by American country music artist Rodney Crowell that has been recorded by several artists. The first version was recorded by American country music artist Tracy Byrd on his 2003 album The Truth About Men. One year later, Crowell and Vince Gill recorded the song as former members Crowell's backing band called The Notorious Cherry Bombs, and was featured on their self-titled album.

The third version of this song was recorded by Australian country music artist Keith Urban on his 2004 album Be Here. Urban's rendition was released as the album's third single on 21 March 2005. His version also reached number one on the U.S. Billboard Hot Country Songs charts and held that position for five weeks.

Music video
The music video is in black-and-white, and was directed by Chris Hicky and premiered on CMT on March 25, 2005.

Chart performance
"Making Memories of Us" debuted at number 55 on the U.S. Billboard Hot Country Singles & Tracks chart for the week of March 19, 2005.

For the Hot Country Songs chart published 4 June 2005, the song's second week at No. 1, artists on the Capitol Nashville label held the No. 1 through No. 3 positions on the chart, making for only the third time in the chart's history that all three positions were held by acts on the same label. 

In addition, "Making Memories of Us" peaked at number 34 on the Billboard Hot 100 and at number 5 on the US Adult Contemporary chart.

Weekly charts

Year-end charts

Certifications

Versions
The Irish country singer Derek Ryan recorded a version of the song. It was included in his 2015 album One Good Night.

References

2005 singles
Rodney Crowell songs
Tracy Byrd songs
Keith Urban songs
Song recordings produced by Dann Huff
Songs written by Rodney Crowell
Capitol Records Nashville singles
Music videos directed by Chris Hicky
Black-and-white music videos
2003 songs
Country ballads